Andrey Vasilyevich Chernigovsky (born 10 February 1983) is a Russian professional association football manager and a former player.

Club career
He played 3 seasons in the Russian Football National League for FC Dynamo Bryansk and FC MVD Rossii Moscow.

References

External links
 

1983 births
People from Bratsk
Living people
Russian footballers
Association football midfielders
FC Saturn Ramenskoye players
FC Dynamo Bryansk players
FC Orenburg players
Russian football managers
FC Mika managers
Russian expatriate football managers
Expatriate football managers in Armenia
FC MVD Rossii Moscow players
Sportspeople from Irkutsk Oblast